The men's 100m Butterfly event at the 2006 Central American and Caribbean Games occurred on Friday, July 21, 2006 at the S.U. Pedro de Heredia Aquatic Complex in Cartagena, Colombia.

Records at the time of the event were:
World Record: 50.40, Ian Crocker (USA), Montreal, Canada, July 30, 2007.
Games Record: 53.86, Francisco Sánchez (Venezuela), 1998 Games in Maracaibo (Aug.12.1998).

Results

Final

Preliminaries

References

Butterfly, Men's 100m